Cesare De Titta (Sant'Eusanio del Sangro, 27 January 1862– ibidem, 14 February 1933) was an Italian poet who wrote in Italian, Latin and in Neapolitan Abruzzese.

His mother was Sofia Loreto, and his father, Vincenzo De Titta, was a public notary. Cesare attended the Seminary of Lanciano since he was sixteen to become a priest and studied classical languages at the Seminary of Venosa from 1881 to 1889, where he would be later its dean. Among his most important linguistic works, we find Grammatica della lingua viva and Grammatica della lingua latina.

Works
Saggi di traduzione of Catulo (1890)
Canzoni abruzzesi (1919)
Nuove canzoni abruzzesi (1923)
Gente d'Abruzzo (1923)
Terra d'oro (1925) 
Acqua, foco, vento (1925)

References

1862 births
1933 deaths
19th-century Italian poets
20th-century Italian poets
19th-century Italian male writers
20th-century Italian male writers
19th-century Latin-language writers
20th-century Latin-language writers
Latin-language writers from Italy
19th-century Italian Roman Catholic priests